Fairies Candles is a public art work by artist Marina Lee. It was installed in Kilbourn-Kadish Park on a bluff overlooking the Milwaukee River near downtown Milwaukee, Wisconsin in 2005.

Description
Fairies Candles consists of three tentacle-like forms that rise from the hillside. Each form tapers vertically from a wide base, snaking skyward. The elements are set on small circular concrete bases. Near the top of each tentacle, small lighting elements are affixed with bulbs directed downward. According to the artist, the woodland black cohosh plant, sometimes known as a fairy candle, inspired the form of the sculpture.

Location
The site was created as part of the City of Milwaukee's renovations of Kilbourn Park and COA's creation of Alice Bertschy Kadish Park on the bluff below. The hillside features a prairie, amphitheatre, soccer field, bicycle path and scenic overlook.

Funding
The sculpture was funded as a community art project during the construction of the amphitheatre with a grant from the Mary Nohl Fund of the Greater Milwaukee Foundation.

References

2005 sculptures
Bronze sculptures in Wisconsin